Banisia lobata is a moth of the family Thyrididae first described by Frederic Moore in 1882. It is found in India, Sri Lanka, Malaysia, China, Hong Kong and Brunei.

Both wings are fawn colored. Several small dark spots are found on both wings. About three white spots can be found near the cell of the forewings.

Two subspecies are recognized.
Banisia lobata caesia Whalley, 1976
Banisia lobata ceylonensis Whalley, 1976

References

Moths of Asia
Moths described in 1882
Thyrididae